Notts Gymnastics Club is an artistic gymnastics club based at East Midlands Gymnastics Centre in Rushcliffe, Nottinghamshire. The club formed in 1997 when Bigwood and Rushcliffe Gymnastics Club combined to share the newly built East Midlands Gymnastics Centre.

Notable gymnasts
The club has produced the following notable gymnasts, all having competed internationally
 Amy Dodsley - 2004 Summer Olympics
 Becky Downie - 2008 Summer Olympics , 2016 Summer Olympics , 2014 European Bars Champion 
 Laura Jones - 2008 Summer Olympics
 Jordan Lipton - 2006 British Espoir Champion
 Emma Prest - Senior GB international
 Niamh Rippin - 2007 Espoir silver medallist
 Elissa Downie - 2013 EYOF Vault Champion, 2016 Summer Olympics , 2017 European Champion

External links
 Club website

Gymnastics organizations
Gymnastics in the United Kingdom
Gymnastics
Gymnastics clubs
Sports clubs established in 1997
1997 establishments in England